The July 1936 military uprising in Melilla occurred at the start of the Spanish Civil War. The rebels seized the main garrisons of the Spanish Army in Africa and by 18 July had crushed the resistance of the army officers loyal to the Republican government. The supporters of the Second Spanish Republic were detained or shot.

Background 
One of the main goals of the Spanish coup of July 1936 was to secure Spanish Morocco, because the Spanish Army of Africa was the main shock force of the Spanish Republican Army. Their members were Spanish regular soldiers, the Spanish Legion, and Moroccan mercenaries, Regulares. Most of their officers supported the plot and rejected the liberal democracy. Only a handful of officers, such as General Manuel Romerales, the commander-in-chief of the Spanish Army in Morocco, General Gomez Morato, and the high commissioner, Placido Alvarez Buylla, were loyal to the Republic, and the Spanish workers in Morocco had no weapons and were isolated from the Moroccan population.

Coup

17 July: Melilla 
The leader of the plot, Emilio Mola, had ordered the Army of Africa to revolt at 5 a.m. on 18 July, but the plan was discovered by Republican officers of Melilla on 17 July, and the leader of the plot in the city, Colonel Segui, decided to start the rising on Melilla and arrested General Romerales. The rebels seized the radio station and proclaimed the estado de guerra. The Legionnaries, the Regulares, and the Assault Guards in Melilla joined to the rising. Seizing key buildings, they crushed the resistance in the working class quarters. General Romerales, the major of Melilla, the government delegate, the aerodrome commander, Virgilio Leret Ruiz, and all those who resisted the rebellion were shot. When General Morato discovered the rising, he took an airplane to Melilla, but he was arrested by the rebels as soon as he landed.

17 July: Ceuta and Tetuán 
Seguí then telephoned Ceuta and Tetuán and sent a telegraph to Franco at Las Palmas. Colonel Juan Yagüe Blanco, with the II Battalion of the Spanish Legion, seized Ceuta while Colonel Saenz de Buruaga, with the V Bandera of the Spanish Legion, took Tetuán.

The rebel troops in Ceuta occupied the working class districts and killed prominent unionists and the major of the city, and in Tetuán, the Foreign Legion seized the Casa del pueblo and executed the union officers and all persons found with arms. Furthermore, Colonel Jan Luis Beigbeder gained the support of the Grand Vizier of Tetuán, Mulay Hassan, and Moroccan volunteers started to join the rebellion.

18 July 
In Larache the coup started at two o'clock in the morning of 18 July. Several engagements followed in which five assault guards and two rebel officers were killed, but by dawn the town was in the hands of the rebels. By mid-morning the only remaining centres of resistance were the High Commissioner's residence and the air force base at Tetuán.

The rebels threatened to bomb both and after a few hours the defenders surrendered to the Nationalists; all of them were executed, among them the high commissioner and the Major de la Puente Bahamonde – Francisco Franco's cousin. The same day, the workers of Tetúan and Melilla attempted a general strike, but were crushed by the insurgent troops.

Nationalist repression 
On his secret instructions of 30 June for the coup in Morocco, Mola ordered: "to eliminate left-wing elements, communists, anarchists, union members, etc". The same day as the rising all the members of trade unions, left-wing parties, Masonic lodges and anyone known to have voted for the Popular Front were arrested. On the first night, the Nationalists executed 189 civilians and soldiers. On 20 July, the Nationalists opened their first Francoist concentration camp in Melilla.

Aftermath 
By 18 July, the Spanish Army of Africa had seized all of Spanish Morocco and crushed the resistance. The same day, Francisco Franco started the rising in the Canary Islands. Then he took a De Havilland Dragon Rapide aircraft, paid for by Luis Bolín, and flew to Casablanca in French Morocco. On 19 July, Franco continued on to Tetuan and appointed himself chief of the Spanish Army in Morocco.

Most of the Republican Navy remained loyal to the government. The loyal ships patrolled the Strait of Gibraltar and Spanish Morocco was isolated from the rebel-held cities in Andalusia; Seville, Cadiz, Cordoba and Granada). Nevertheless, with the aid of Nazi Germany and Fascist Italy, the Nationalists managed to transport the Army of Africa's troops to the mainland and start their advance towards Madrid.

See also 

 List of Spanish Nationalist military equipment of the Spanish Civil War
 List of Spanish Republican military equipment of the Spanish Civil War

Footnotes

Bibliography 
 
 
 

1936 in Morocco
1936 in Spain
Conflicts in 1936
History of Melilla
July 1936 events
20th-century rebellions
Battles of the Spanish Civil War